The 2014–15 Montana State Bobcats women's basketball team represented Montana State University during the 2014–15 NCAA Division I women's basketball season. The Bobcats, led by ninth year head coach Tricia Binford, played their home games at Worthington Arena and were members of the Big Sky Conference. They finished the season 15–15, 9–9 in Big Sky play to finish in a three-way tie for fifth place. They lost in the quarterfinals of the Big Sky women's tournament to Sacramento State.

Roster

Schedule

|-
!colspan=9 style="background:#0a1f62; color:#c1b465;"| Regular Season

|-
!colspan=9 style="background:#0a1f62; color:#c1b465;"| Big Sky Women's Tournament

See also
2014–15 Montana State Bobcats men's basketball team

References

Montana State Bobcats women's basketball seasons
Montana State